Rob Krimmel (born September 27, 1977) is the men's basketball head coach at Saint Francis University in Loretto, Pennsylvania since 2012.

Saint Francis University
Krimmel was named the 21st head coach in Saint Francis University men's basketball program history, succeeding Don Friday who retired after 4 seasons at the helm.

Head coaching record

References

1977 births
Living people
American men's basketball coaches
American men's basketball players
Saint Francis Red Flash men's basketball coaches
Saint Francis Red Flash men's basketball players
Point guards